Raja Rao Inderjit Singh Yadav   is an Scion of erstwhile state of Rewari Indian politician and a Minister of State (Independent Charge)  in the Government of India. A member of the 17th Lok Sabha, the lower house of the Parliament of India, he represents Gurugram in Haryana and is a member of Bharatiya Janata Party.

At the national level, he has served as Cabinet Minister for the Environment, as Minister of State for External Affairs, and as Minister of State for Defence Production. Since 2009 he has chaired the Parliamentary Information technology committee. Earlier he was in Indian National Congress party. Rao Inderjit is considered one of the most powerful leaders of Ahirwal belt of Haryana. Rao Inderjit is descendant of freedom fighter and Maharaja of Kingdom of Rewari Rao Tula Ram.

Early life
Rao is born in Royal family of Erstwhile State of Rewari (Ahirwal) and is the son of Raja Rao Birendra Singh, who served as a second Chief Minister of Haryana. Rao studied at the Lawrence School, Sanawar and the Faculty of Law, University of Delhi where he took a law degree. He is descendant of Raja Rao Tula Ram, a freedom fighter of India's first war of independence in 1857.

Political career

Haryana assembly
Rao was an MLA in the Haryana assembly for four terms, beginning in 1977. From 1982 to 1987 he was a provincial Minister of State responsible for Food and civil supplies.
He was elected to the Lok Sabha as a Member of Parliament in 1998, serving in the parliaments of 1998-1999, 2000–2004, and 2004–2009. From 1991 to 1996 he served as Cabinet Minister for the Environment, Forest, Medical and Technical Education, then as Minister of State for External Affairs (2004–2006) and as Minister of State for Defense Production from 2006 to 2009. Since 2009 he has chaired the Parliamentary Information technology committee.

Elections won
 1998: elected to the 12th Lok Sabha from Mohindergarh on the ticket of Indian National Congress
 2004: elected to the 14th Lok Sabha from Mohindergarh on the ticket of Indian National Congress
 2009: elected to the 15th Lok Sabha from the new seat of Gurgaon, winning 2,78,516 votes on Congress ticket, in a contest with 23 other candidates.
 2014: elected to the 16th Lok Sabha from the ticket of Bhartiya Janta Party. He resigned from Congress party & Joined BJP
 2019: elected to the 17th Lok Sabha from the ticket of Bhartiya Janta Party and retained his seat of Gurgaon, winning 8,81,546 votes in a contest with 23 other candidates.

Against Bhupinder Singh Hooda
Rao Inderjit Singh, who hails from South Haryana, alleged that the Haryana Chief Minister Bhupinder Singh Hooda was developing his own constituency Rohtak at the cost of other parts of the state. He presented the data procured through RTI to support his allegation: Out of a total of 5,135 announcements of schemes in Haryana, 2,045 were for the three districts of Rohtak, Jhajjar and Sonepat that comprise areas of Hooda's own constituency and that of his son Deepender Singh Hooda. Of the 3,356 completed schemes, 1,560 were from these three districts. On 23 September 2013, he resigned from Congress.

Union minister
Singh became the Minister of State (Independent Charge) for Statistics and Programme Implementation and Planning in May 2019.

Shooting career
Rao Inderjit Singh was a member of the Indian shooting Team from 1990 to 2003 and won a Bronze Medal at the Commonwealth Shooting Championship. He was also a National Champion in Skeet for three consecutive years and won three gold medals in the SAF Games.

See also
 Rao Tula Ram

References

External links 

|-

|-

|-

|-

|-

1951 births
Living people
India MPs 2004–2009
India MPs 2009–2014
Lawrence School, Sanawar alumni
Lok Sabha members from Haryana
India MPs 2014–2019
Bharatiya Janata Party politicians from Haryana
Indian National Congress politicians
Indian male sport shooters
Faculty of Law, University of Delhi alumni
People from Rewari
Narendra Modi ministry
India MPs 1998–1999
South Asian Games gold medalists for India
Members of the National Cadet Corps (India)
India MPs 2019–present
South Asian Games medalists in shooting
Vishal Haryana Party politicians